A major stationary source is a source that emits more than a certain amount of a pollutant as defined by the U.S. Environmental Protection Agency (EPA). The amount of pollutants allowed for certain new sources is defined by the EPA's New Source Performance Standards (NSPRS).

A stationary source in air quality terminology is any fixed emitter of air pollutants, such as fossil fuel burning power plants, petroleum refineries, petrochemical plants, food processing plants and other heavy industrial sources.

A mobile source in air quality terminology is a non-stationary source of air pollutants, such as automobiles, buses, trucks, ships, trains, aircraft and various other vehicles.

See also
Air pollution dispersion terminology
Atmospheric dispersion modeling
AP 42 Compilation of Air Pollutant Emission Factors
Lowest Achievable Emissions Rate

References

United States Environmental Protection Agency
Atmospheric dispersion modeling